Narcissea is a genus of fungi in the family Psathyrellaceae.

Taxonomy 
The Narcissea genus was created in 2020 by the German mycologists Dieter Wächter & Andreas Melzer when the Psathyrellaceae family was subdivided based on phylogenetic analysis. Two members of the Coprinopsis genus were reclassified as Narcissea. A study in 2021 by mycologist Pietro Voto placed a third species, Coprinopsis cardiaspora in this genus.

The type species, Narcissea patouillardii was previously classified as Coprinopsis patouillardii.

Etymology 
This genus is named after the French mycologist Narcisse Théophile Patouillard.

Species

References 

Psathyrellaceae
Agaricales genera